Diuris setacea, commonly called the bristly donkey orchid, is a species of orchid that is endemic to the south-west of Western Australia. It has a tuft of up to ten twisted leaves at its base and up to seven yellow flowers with a few brown markings. It grows in moist soil on granite outcrops and flowers much more prolifically after fire the previous summer.

Description
Diuris setacea is a tuberous, perennial herb with between six and ten spirally twisted leaves in a tuft at its base. Flowering occurs from October to December but much more prolifically after fire the previous summer.

Taxonomy and naming
Diuris setacea was first described in 1810 by Robert Brown and the description was published in his Prodromus Florae Novae Hollandiae et Insulae Van Diemen. The specific epithet (setacea) is derived from the Latin word seta meaning "bristle".

Distribution and habitat
The bristly donkey orchid grows in low heath in moist soil on granite outcrops between Esperance and Kalbarri.

Conservation
Diuris setacea is classified as "not threatened" by the Government of Western Australia Department of Parks and Wildlife.

References

External links
 

setacea
Endemic orchids of Australia
Orchids of Western Australia
Endemic flora of Western Australia
Plants described in 1810